The Saturday Evening Post is an American magazine, currently published six times a year. It was issued weekly under this title from 1897 until 1963, then every two weeks until 1969. From the 1920s to the 1960s, it was one of the most widely circulated and influential magazines within the American middle class, with fiction, non-fiction, cartoons and features that reached two million homes every week. The magazine declined in readership through the 1960s, and in 1969 The Saturday Evening Post folded for two years before being revived as a quarterly publication with an emphasis on medical articles in 1971. As of the late 2000s, The Saturday Evening Post is published six times a year by the Saturday Evening Post Society, which purchased the magazine in 1982. The magazine was redesigned in 2013.

History

Rise
The Saturday Evening Post was first published in 1821 in the same printing shop at 53 Market Street in Philadelphia where the Benjamin Franklin-founded Pennsylvania Gazette had been published in the 18th century. While the Gazette ceased publication in 1800, ten years after Franklin's death, the Post links its history to the original magazine.

Heyday
The Post grew to become the most widely circulated weekly magazine in America. The magazine gained prominent status under the leadership of its longtime editor George Horace Lorimer (1899–1937).

The Saturday Evening Post published current event articles, editorials, human interest pieces, humor, illustrations, a letter column, poetry (with contributions submitted by readers), single-panel gag cartoons (including Hazel by Ted Key) and stories by the leading writers of the time. It was known for commissioning lavish illustrations and original works of fiction. Illustrations were featured on the cover and embedded in stories and advertising. Some Post illustrations continue to be reproduced as posters or prints, especially those by Norman Rockwell. In 1954 it published its first articles on the role of the US in deposing Mohammad Mosaddegh, Prime Minister of Iran, in 1953. The article was based on materials leaked by CIA director Allen Dulles.

Decline
The Post readership began to decline in the late 1950s and 1960s. In general, the decline of general interest magazines was blamed on television, which competed for advertisers and readers' attention. The Post had problems retaining readers: the public's taste in fiction was changing, and the Posts conservative politics and values appealed to a declining number of people. Content by popular writers became harder to obtain. Prominent authors drifted away to newer magazines offering more money and status. As a result, the Post published more articles on current events and cut costs by replacing illustrations with photographs for covers and advertisements.

Curtis Publishing Co. v. Butts
The magazine's publisher, Curtis Publishing Company, lost a landmark defamation suit, Curtis Publishing Co. v. Butts 388 U.S. 130 (1967), resulting from an article, and was ordered to pay U.S.$3,060,000 in damages to the plaintiff. The Post article implied that football coaches Paul "Bear" Bryant and Wally Butts conspired to fix a game between the University of Alabama and the University of Georgia. Both coaches sued Curtis Publishing Co. for defamation, each initially asking for $10 million.  Bryant eventually settled for $300,000, while Butts' case went to the Supreme Court, which held that libel damages may be recoverable (in this instance against a news organization) when the injured party is a non-public official, if the plaintiff can prove that the defendant was guilty of a reckless lack of professional standards when examining allegations for reasonable credibility.  (Butts was eventually awarded $460,000.)

William Emerson was promoted to editor-in-chief in 1965 and remained in the position until the magazine's demise in 1969.

Closure
In 1968, Martin Ackerman, a specialist in troubled firms, became president of Curtis after lending it $5 million. Although at first he said there were no plans to shut down the magazine, soon he halved its circulation, purportedly in an attempt to increase the quality of the audience, and then subsequently did shut it down. In announcing that the February 8, 1969, issue would be the magazine's last, Curtis executive Martin Ackerman stated that the magazine had lost $5 million in 1968 and would lose a projected $3 million in 1969. In a meeting with employees after the magazine's closure had been announced, Emerson thanked the staff for their professional work and promised "to stay here and see that everyone finds a job".

At a March 1969 post-mortem on the magazine's closing, Emerson stated that The Post "was a damn good vehicle for advertising" with competitive renewal rates and readership reports and expressed what The New York Times called "understandable bitterness" in wishing "that all the one-eyed critics will lose their other eye". Otto Friedrich, the magazine's last managing editor, blamed the death of The Post on Curtis. In his Decline and Fall (Harper & Row, 1970), an account of the magazine's final years (1962–69), he argued that corporate management was unimaginative and incompetent. Friedrich acknowledges that The Post faced challenges while the tastes of American readers changed over the course of the 1960s, but he insisted that the magazine maintained a standard of good quality and was appreciated by readers.

Reemergence
In 1970, control of the debilitated Curtis Publishing Company was acquired from the estate of Cyrus Curtis by Indianapolis industrialist Beurt SerVaas. SerVaas relaunched the Post the following year on a quarterly basis as a kind of nostalgia magazine.

In early 1982, ownership of the Post was transferred to the Benjamin Franklin Literary and Medical Society, founded in 1976 by the Post'''s then-editor, Dr. Corena "Cory" SerVaas (wife of Beurt SerVaas).  The magazine's core focus was now health and medicine; indeed, the magazine's website originally noted that the "credibility of The Saturday Evening Post has made it a valuable asset for reaching medical consumers and for helping medical researchers obtain family histories. In the magazine, national health surveys are taken to further current research on topics such as cancer, diabetes, high blood pressure, heart disease, ulcerative colitis, spina bifida, and bipolar disorder."  Ownership of the magazine was later transferred to the Saturday Evening Post Society; Dr. SerVaas headed both organizations. The range of topics covered in the magazine's articles is now wide, suitable for a general readership.

By 1991, Curtis Publishing Company had been renamed Curtis International, a subsidiary of SerVaas Inc., and had become an importer of audiovisual equipment.  Today the Post is published six times a year by the Saturday Evening Post Society, which claims  501(c)(3) non-profit organization status.

With the January/February 2013 issue, the Post launched a major makeover of the publication, including a new cover design and efforts to increase the magazine's profile, in response to a general public misbelief that it was no longer in existence. The magazine's new logo is an update of a logo it had used beginning in 1942. As of October 2018, the complete archive of the magazine is available online.

Legacy
The Post has made significant contributions to American and world culture.

Illustrations

In 1916, Saturday Evening Post editor George Horace Lorimer discovered Norman Rockwell, then an unknown 22-year-old New York artist. Lorimer promptly purchased two illustrations from Rockwell, using them as covers, and commissioned three more drawings. Rockwell's illustrations of the American family and rural life of a bygone era became icons. During his 50-year career with the Post, Rockwell painted more than 300 covers.

The Post also employed Nebraska artist John Philip Falter, who became known as "a painter of Americana with an accent of the Middle West," who "brought out some of the homeliness and humor of Middle Western town life and home life." He produced 120 covers for the Post between 1943 and 1968, ceasing only when the magazine began displaying photographs on its covers. 

Another prominent artist was Charles R. Chickering, a freelance illustrator who went on to design numerous postage stamps for the U.S. Post Office. Other popular cover illustrators include artists George Hughes, Constantin Alajalov,
John Clymer, Alonzo Kimball, W. H. D. Koerner, J. C. Leyendecker, Mead Schaeffer, Charles Archibald MacLellan, John E. Sheridan, Emmett Watson, Douglass Crockwell, Amos Sewell, James R. Bingham and N. C. Wyeth.

Cartoonists have included:  Bob Barnes, Irwin Caplan, Tom Henderson, Al Johns, Clyde Lamb, Jerry Marcus, Frank O'Neal, Charles M. Schulz, B. Tobey, Pete Wyma and Bill Yates. The magazine ran Ted Key's cartoon panel series Hazel from 1943 to 1969.

Literature
Each issue featured several original short stories and often included an installment of a serial appearing in successive issues.  Most of the fiction was written for mainstream tastes by popular writers, but some literary writers were featured.  The opening pages of stories featured paintings by the leading magazine illustrators.

The Post published stories and essays by H. E. Bates, Ray Bradbury, Kay Boyle, Agatha Christie, Brian Cleeve, Eleanor Franklin Egan, William Faulkner, F. Scott Fitzgerald, C. S. Forester, Ernest Haycox, Robert A. Heinlein, Kurt Vonnegut, Paul Gallico, Normand Poirier, Hammond Innes, Louis L'Amour, Sinclair Lewis, Joseph C. Lincoln, John P. Marquand, Edgar Allan Poe, Mary Roberts Rinehart, Sax Rohmer, William Saroyan, John Steinbeck, Rex Stout, Rob Wagner,  Edith Wharton, and P.G. Wodehouse.

Poetry published came from poets including:  Carl Sandburg, Ogden Nash, Dorothy Parker, and Hannah Kahn.

Jack London's best-known novel The Call of the Wild was first published, in serialized form, in the Saturday Evening Post in 1903.

Emblematic of the Post's fiction was author Clarence Budington Kelland, who first appeared in 1916–17 with stories of homespun heroes, "Efficiency Edgar" and "Scattergood Baines".  Kelland was a steady presence from 1922 until 1961.

For many years William Hazlett Upson contributed a very popular series of short stories about the escapades of Earthworm Tractors salesman Alexander Botts.

Publication in the Post launched careers and helped established artists and writers stay afloat.  P. G. Wodehouse said "the wolf was always at the door" until the Post gave him his "first break"  in 1915 by serializing Something New.

Politics
After the election of Franklin D. Roosevelt, Post columnist Garet Garrett became a vocal critic of the New Deal. Garrett accused the Roosevelt administration of initiating socialist strategies. After editor George Lorimer died, Garrett became editorial writer-in-chief and criticized the Roosevelt administration's support of the United Kingdom and efforts to prepare to enter what became the Second World War, and allegedly showed some support for Adolf Hitler in some of his editorials. Garrett's positions aroused controversy and may have cost the Post readers and advertisers in the aftermath of Pearl Harbor and the Holocaust.

Editors
(Listed from the purchase by Curtis, 1898)

Cover gallery

See also
 Constantin Alajalov
 Cyrus Curtis
 John Philip Falter
 Anton Otto Fischer
 Garet Garrett
 Ladies' Home Journal J. C. Leyendecker
 Norman Rockwell
 John E. Sheridan (illustrator)
 Harry Simmons
 Frank Glasgow Tinker
 Edmund Ward

Similar magazines
 Collier's Harper's Weekly Liberty Life Look Reader's Digest (still in publication)

References

Further reading
 Cohn, Jan. Creating America: George Horace Lorimer and the Saturday Evening Post (University of Pittsburgh Press, 1990)
 Damon-Moore, Helen. Magazines for the millions: Gender and commerce in the Ladies' Home Journal and the Saturday Evening Post, 1880–1910 (SUNY Press, 1994)
 Hall, Roger I. "A system pathology of an organization: the rise and fall of the old Saturday Evening Post." Administrative science quarterly (1976): 185–211. in JSTOR
 Tebbel, John William. George Horace Lorimer and the Saturday Evening Post (1948)

External links

 
 Saturday Evening Post illustration archive 1923–1975
 George Horace Lorimer
 More Irrelevant Than Irreverent Pete Hamill for The Village Voice'' January 16, 1969
 Saturday Evening Post digital archive

 
Bimonthly magazines published in the United States
Biweekly magazines published in the United States
Conservative magazines published in the United States
Literary magazines published in the United States
Magazines disestablished in 1969
Magazines established in 1821
Magazines reestablished in 1971
Magazines published in Indianapolis
News magazines published in the United States
Political magazines published in the United States
Quarterly magazines published in the United States
Weekly magazines published in the United States